Claudio Puglisi (born 1960 in Voghera, Italy) is an Italian former football referee and linesman. He was implicated in the 2006 Serie A scandal for his contacts with Leonardo Meani before an April 2005 match with Chievo Verona.

References

1960 births
Living people
People from Voghera
Italian football referees
Sportspeople involved in betting scandals
Sportspeople from the Province of Pavia